Benjamin Pritchard is a British para-rower. He participated at the 2022 European Championships in the men's PR1M1x event, being awarded the bronze medal. He also participated at the 2022 World Rowing Championships in the PR1 men's single sculls event, being awarded the bronze medal.

Pritchard participated at the 2020 Summer Paralympics in the rowing competition, winning no medals and finishing in fifth place in the men's single sculls event.

References

External links 

Living people
Place of birth missing (living people)
Year of birth missing (living people)
British male rowers
Rowers at the 2020 Summer Paralympics
World Rowing Championships medalists for Great Britain
Paralympic rowers of Great Britain